Notable people from Angola include:

Athletes 

Akwá (born 1977), footballer, Parliament member (MPLA)
Flávio Amado (born 1979), footballer
Didi, footballer
Ze Kalanga (born 1983), footballer
Mantorras (born 1982), footballer
Rui Marques (born 1977), footballer
Nando Rafael (born 1984), footballer
Manuel Sala (born 1982), footballer
Simão (Angolan footballer) (born 1976)

Clergy
 Oscar Lino Lopes Fernandes Braga (1931-2020), Roman Catholic bishop of Benguela since 1975 until 2008
 Manuel Franklin da Costa (1921-2003), Roman Catholic Archbishop
 Damião António Franklin (1950-2014), Roman Catholic Archbishop
 Alexandre do Nascimento (born 1925), Roman Catholic Archbishop from 1977 to 2001

Military
 João de Matos (1955-2017), military general
 Nzingha, 17th-century queen of the Ndongo and Matamba Kingdoms of the Mbundu people in southwestern Africa - also known as Ana de Sousa Nzinga Mbande

Musicians
 Aline Frazão (born 1988), singer/songwriter
 Anselmo Ralph (born 1981), singer/songwriter
Bonga (born 1943), singer/songwriter of Angolan folk music including Semba
 Paulo Flores (born 1972), Semba musician

Photographers 

 Chilala Moco (born 1977), photographer
 Depara (1928-1997), photographer who worked in the Democratic Republic of Congo

Politicians
 Nito Alves (1945-1977), member of the People's Movement for the Liberation of Angola
 Mário Pinto de Andrade (1928-1990), founding member and former president of the People's Movement for the Liberation of Angola
 Mawete João Baptista, ambassador
 Américo Boavida (1923-1968), physician and member of the People's Movement for the Liberation of Angola
 Maria Mambo Café (1945-2013), politician
 Boaventura Cardoso (born 1944), former Minister of Culture
 Abel Apalanga Chivukuvuku (born 1957), politician, member of UNITA, and member of the Pan-African Parliament
 Carlos Contreiras, President of the Republican Party 
 Viriato da Cruz (1928-1973), secretary of the People's Movement for the Liberation of Angola
 António Dembo (1944-2002), politician, rebel and vice-president of UNITA from 1992 to 2002
 José Eduardo dos Santos (born 1942), President of Angola 1979-2017
 Efigênia dos Santos Lima Clemente, member of the Pan-African Parliament
 Aguinaldo Jaime (born 1954), current Deputy Prime Minister of Angola
 Almerindo Jaka Jamba (born 1949), politician, former leader of UNITA
 Lúcio Lara (1929-2016), founding member of the People's Movement for the Liberation of Angola
 João Manuel Gonçalves Lourenço (born 1954), politician, third president of Angola (from 2017)
 Maria Haller (1923-2006), ambassador and writer
 Ana Dias Lourenço (born 1957), Minister of Planning from 1999
 Paulo Lukamba (born 1954), politician, rebel and leader of UNITA from 2002 to 2003
 Marcolino José Carlos Moco (born 1953), Prime Minister of Angola from 1992 to 1996
 José Pedro de Morais (born 1955), Minister of Finance since 2002
 Venâncio da Silva Moura (1934-1999), Minister of External Relations from 1992 to 1999
 Lopo do Nascimento (born 1942), first Prime Minister of Angola serving from 1975 to 1978
 António Agostinho Neto (1922-1979), first President of Angola serving from 1975 to 1979
 Pitra Neto (born 1958), Minister of Public Administration, Employment and Social Security from 1992
 Domingos Manuel Njinga, member of the Pan-African Parliament
 José Patrício, ambassador to the UN
 Anália de Victória Pereira (1941-2008), leader of the Liberal Democratic Party
 Holden Roberto (1923-2007), politician, Founding member of the National Front for the Liberation of Angola
 Isaías Samakuva (born 1946), politician, and current leader of UNITA
 Jonas Savimbi (1934–2002), politician and leader of UNITA
 Maria Elizabeth Simbrão de Carvalho, ambassador
 Paulo Teixeira Jorge (born 1934), Minister of External Relations from 1976 to 1984
 Fernando José de França Dias Van-Dúnem (born 1952), Prime Minister of Angola from 1991 to 1992 and from 1996 to 1999
 Jerónimo Elavoko Wanga (1934-2007), member of the Pan-African Parliament

Writers
See: List of Angolan writers

 Henrique Abranches (1932-2004), poet
 Antero Abreu (1927-2017), poet
 José Eduardo Agualusa (born 1960), Angola born Portuguese journalist and fiction writer
 Mário Pinto de Andrade (1928-1990), poet and politician
 Arlindo Barbeitos (born 1940), poet
 Dulce Braga (born 1958)
 Lisa Castel (born 1955), writer and journalist
 Alberto Graves Chakussanga (1978-2010), murdered Angolan radio journalist
 Tomaz Vieira da Cruz (1900-1960), poet
 Viriato da Cruz (1928-1973), poet
 Lopito Feijóo (born 1963), poet
Isabel Ferreira (born 1958)
 Ernesto Lara Filho (1932-1977), poet
 António Jacinto (1924-1991), poet and political activist 
 Sousa Jamba (born 1966), Anglophone journalist and novelist
 Alda Lara (1930-1962), poet
 Amélia da Lomba (born 1961), writer and journalist
 Rafael Marques (born 1971), journalist
 Manuel Rui Monteiro (born 1941), poet
 Agostinho Neto (1922-1979), poet  
 Ondjaki (born 1977), poet, novelist and dramatist
 Pepetela, pen-name of Artur Carlos Maurício Pestana dos Santos (born 1941), writer of fiction
 José de Fontes Pereira (1838-1891), early Angolan journalist
Wanda Ramos (1948-1998) 
Oscar Ribas (1909-2004), novelist
 Alcides Sakala Simões (born 1953)
 Ana de Santana (born 1960)
 Arnaldo Santos (born 1936), poet
 Paula Tavares (born 1952), poet
 José Luandino Vieira (born 1935), short-story writer and novelist 
 Uanhenga Xitu (1924-2014), writer and nationalist

Other 
Leila Lopes (born 1986), Miss Universe 2011
Ana Clara Guerra Marques, dancer
Adjany Costa (born 1990), conservationist and ichthyologist

See also
 Demographics of Angola
 List of Angola-related topics
List of Portuguese-language poets

References